"Simple Things" is a song co-written and recorded by American singer-songwriter Jim Brickman. It was released in August 2001 as the lead single from the album of the same name. Brickman's co-writers were Darrell Brown and Beth Nielsen Chapman. Brickman performed the song with Rebecca Lynn Howard. The single was Brickman's eleventh chart release on the Adult Contemporary chart and his first number one. "Simple Things" spent one week at number one, but failed to chart on the Billboard Hot 100.

Chart performance

References

2001 singles
Jim Brickman songs
Rebecca Lynn Howard songs
Songs written by Beth Nielsen Chapman
Songs written by Darrell Brown (musician)
Songs written by Jim Brickman
2001 songs